KrolStonE Continental Team was a Dutch UCI Continental team that existed from 2006 until 2009. It nurtured future professionals such as Lieuwe Westra, Pim Ligthart, and Bert-Jan Lindeman.

Final roster

Major wins
Source:
2007
 ZLM Tour, Ismaël Kip
 Stage 2 (ITT) OZ Wielerweekend, Lieuwe Westra
2008
 Tour du Loir-et-Cher
Stages 1 & 5, Jos Pronk
Stage 4, Niels Scheuneman
 Stage 5 Olympia's Tour, Jos Pronk
 Stage 1 Tour Alsace, Lieuwe Westra

References

UCI Continental Teams (Europe)
Cycling teams based in the Netherlands
Defunct cycling teams based in the Netherlands
2006 establishments in the Netherlands
2009 disestablishments in the Netherlands
Cycling teams established in 2006
Cycling teams disestablished in 2009